Dabanal Padak (Bengali: দাবানল পদক) is a military medal of Bangladesh. The medal is intended to reward servicemen who took part in the campaign in the Chittagong Hill Tracts. The Chittagong Hill Tracts are a territory in southeastern Bangladesh on the border with India and Myanmar, the only mountainous region in the country.

References 

Military awards and decorations of Bangladesh